Sirly Tiik (born 4 September 1974 in Tallinn) is an Estonian Paralympic athlete with an intellectual disability. At the 2000 Sydney Paralympics, she won a gold medal in the Women's Javelin F20 event and two bronze medals in the Women's High Jump F20 and Women's Shot Put F20 events. She received a letter from Estonian President Lennart Meri for her achievement.

References

1974 births
Living people
Paralympic athletes of Estonia
Athletes (track and field) at the 2000 Summer Paralympics
Paralympic gold medalists for Estonia
Paralympic bronze medalists for Estonia
Intellectual Disability category Paralympic competitors
Athletes from Tallinn
Medalists at the 2000 Summer Paralympics
Competitors in athletics with intellectual disability
Paralympic medalists in athletics (track and field)
Estonian female high jumpers
Estonian female javelin throwers
Estonian female shot putters